The list of shipwrecks in 1980 includes ships sunk, foundered, grounded, or otherwise lost during 1980.

January

1 January

12 January

15 January

17 January

18 January

20 January

22 January

28 January

30 January

31 January

February

2 February

6 February

7 February

17 February

23 February

March

1 March

7 March

10 March

11 March

12 March

14 March

15 March

17 March

20 March

25 March

27 March

29 March

April

1 April

2 April

3 April

16 April

19 April

20 April

22 April

27 April

Unknown date

May

1 May

3 May

9 May

11 May

15 May

18 May

22 May

29 May

June

4 June

6 June

7 June

14 June

July

4 July

7 July

27 July

31 July

August

1 August

17 August

27 August

September

7 September

9 September

20 September

21 September

27 September

October

6 October

11 October

17 October

18 October

22 October

25 October

26 October

31 October–1 November (overnight)

Unknown date

November

3 November

4 November

11 November

13 November

19 November

21 November

23 November

26 November

29 November

December

1 December

15 December

18 December

Unknown date

References

1980
 
Shipwrecks